The Boina River is a small river in the south west Algarve, Portugal.

Description 
The rivers confluence is with the Arade River forming the western arm of the Arade estuary and is known as the Boina estuary. The head of the estuary is near the village of Arge.

References 

Boina
Boina